One Galle Face is a mixed-use complex of buildings near the Galle Face Green in Colombo, Sri Lanka. It is also Sri Lanka's first internationally and developed and managed mixed use project and was officially opened on 8 November 2019. The facility consists of four skyscrapers, one which will be open for businesses to set up offices, two for the residential component, and the fourth as part of a hotel. A shopping mall is also part of the project. The premises in its entirety is owned by Shangri-La.

They will also contain 16 penthouses.

Shangri-La Colombo opened on 16 November 2017, as the first of the four project components to do so. The hotel has 500 rooms and 41 serviced apartments.

Shopping mall

It is planned to contain a multiplex (operated by PVR Cinemas), a  food court (operated by Food Studio), a supermarket, and a planned capacity of 300 units of retail, entertainment and dining outlets. Keells Super will also operate a gourmet supermarket within the Mall. The mall was opened to the public on 8 November 2019 by President Maithripala Sirisena which also marked his last inauguration ceremony as the President of the country.

References

Buildings and structures in Colombo
Residential skyscrapers in Sri Lanka
Apartment buildings in Colombo
Twin towers
Skyscraper office buildings in Sri Lanka
Residential skyscrapers